Eddie "Cleanhead" Vinson (born Edward L. Vinson Jr.; December 18, 1917 – July 2, 1988) was an American jump blues, jazz, bebop and R&B alto saxophonist and blues shouter. He was nicknamed Cleanhead after an incident in which his hair was accidentally destroyed by lye contained in a hair straightening product, necessitating shaving it off; enamoured of the look, Vinson maintained a shaved head thereafter. Music critic Robert Christgau has called Vinson "one of the cleanest—and nastiest—blues voices you'll ever hear."

Biography

Vinson was born in Houston, Texas. He was a member of the horn section in Milton Larkin's orchestra, which he joined in the late 1930s. At various times, he sat next to Arnett Cobb, Illinois Jacquet, and Tom Archia, while other members of the band included Cedric Haywood and Wild Bill Davis. After exiting Larkin's employment in 1941, Vinson picked up a few vocal tricks while on tour with bluesman Big Bill Broonzy. He then moved to New York and joined the Cootie Williams Orchestra from 1942 to 1945, recording such tunes as "Cherry Red". Vinson struck out on his own in 1945, forming his own large band, signing with Mercury Records, and enjoying a double-sided hit in 1947 with his R&B chart-topper "Old Maid Boogie", and the song that would prove to be his signature number, "Kidney Stew Blues".

Vinson's jazz leanings were probably heightened during 1952–1953, when his band included a young John Coltrane. In the late 1960s, touring in a strict jazz capacity with Jay McShann, Vinson's career took an upswing. In the early 1960s Vinson moved to Los Angeles and began working with the Johnny Otis Revue. A 1970 appearance at the Monterey Jazz Festival with Otis spurred a bit of a comeback for Vinson. Throughout the 1970s  he worked high-profile blues and jazz sessions for Count Basie, Otis, Roomful of Blues, Arnett Cobb, and Buddy Tate. He also composed steadily, including "Tune Up" and "Four", both of which have been incorrectly attributed to Miles Davis.

Vinson recorded extensively during his fifty-odd year career and performed regularly in Europe and the U.S.  He died in 1988, from a heart attack while undergoing chemotherapy, in Los Angeles, California.

Discography

With Oliver Nelson
 Swiss Suite (Flying Dutchman, 1971 [rel. 1972])

With Arnett Cobb and the Muse All Stars
 Live at Sandy's! (Muse 5191, 1978 [rel. 1980])
 More Arnett Cobb and the Muse All Stars (Live at Sandy's!) (Muse 5236, 1978 [rel. 1983])

With Buddy Tate and the Muse All Stars
 Live at Sandy's (Muse 5198, 1978 [rel. 1980])
 Hard Blowin' (Live at Sandy's) (Muse 5249, 1978 [rel. 1984])

With Helen Humes and the Muse All Stars
 Helen Humes and the Muse All Stars (Muse 5217, 1978 [rel. 1980]) - with Arnett Cobb and Buddy Tate

References

External links
Houston's own, Eddie "Cleanhead" Vinson!
NBR: Blues and Jazz Get Rollicking Together

All About Jazz: Eddie "Cleanhead" Vinson
'I Remember Eddie Cleanhead Vinson', by Steve Holt

1917 births
1988 deaths
Musicians from Houston
Rhythm and blues saxophonists
West Coast blues saxophonists
Bebop saxophonists
American blues singers
American rhythm and blues musicians
American jazz alto saxophonists
American male saxophonists
Muse Records artists
West Coast blues musicians
New York blues musicians
Jump blues musicians
20th-century American singers
20th-century American saxophonists
Jazz musicians from Texas
20th-century American male singers
American male jazz musicians
JSP Records artists
Black & Blue Records artists
Black Lion Records artists
Pablo Records artists